Airdrie railway station, also known as Airdrie East railway station, served the town of Airdrie, North Lanarkshire, Scotland from 1886 to 1943 on the Airdrie to Newhouse Branch.

History 
The station opened on 1 June 1886 by the Caledonian Railway. To the south was a goods yard and to the southeast was a locomotive shed. The services were reintroduced on 1 March 1919. The station closed on 3 May 1943.

References

External links 

Disused railway stations in North Lanarkshire
Former Caledonian Railway stations
Railway stations in Great Britain opened in 1886
Railway stations in Great Britain closed in 1943
1886 establishments in Scotland
1943 disestablishments in Scotland
Airdrie, North Lanarkshire